The Federal Emergency Management Agency' s (FEMA) Public Assistance Program provides aid in the wake of a major disaster to state and local governments, and to certain non-profits, to help communities in their recovery efforts.

The Public Assistance Program provides federal disaster grant assistance for debris removal, emergency protective measures, and the repair, replacement, or restoration of disaster-damaged property.  The Public Assistance Program is meant to supplement any federal disaster grant assistance that a business or organization has already received.  The Public Assistance, or PA Program, is based on a partnership between FEMA, State, and local officials.  The federal share of assistance should be less than 75% of the eligible cost of emergency efforts and restoration. The remaining funds are generally allocated by the state government agencies and are distributed amongst eligible applicants.

Applicant eligibility criteria 
In order to receive a Public Assistance Grant, the applicant must register within 60 days of the disaster. The applicant must first be deemed eligible to apply for FEMA Public Assistance.  Those eligible include: state government agencies, local governments, federally recognized Indian tribes, and private non-profit organizations.

Facility eligibility criteria 
For a facility to be eligible for FEMA Public Assistance, it must be located in a designated disaster area and be under the legal responsibility of an eligible applicant.  The facility should have been in active use at the time of the disaster; and open to the general public.

Types of work covered 
The FEMA Public Assistance Grant Program can only be applied to two types of disaster recovery work.  The first is emergency work – this includes the debris removal and the preventative measures taken to secure the property and prevent further damage to the property and to public health. The second is permanent work – which covers the measures needed to restore, or replace, the property.

Grant application process 
The application processes is somewhat lengthy, and can include the following steps:

A preliminary damage assessment from which an immediate needs funding and expedited payments are derived
Applicants’ Briefing where applicants receive and complete a Request for Public Assistance form
In the event of a successful Request for Public Assistance, the applicant is assigned a public assistance coordinator
The next phase is an introductory meeting, which is composed of the applicant and their public assistance coordinator
The applicant's specific needs will be identified and cost estimates will be derived through the project formulation process
Cost estimates for small projects that have been previously prepared are confirmed through a standardized validation process
And finally if eligible, FEMA approves and processes funding for the disaster recovery project

References 

Federal Emergency Management Agency
FEMA
Disaster preparedness in the United States
Emergency services in the United States
Organizations based in Washington, D.C.